Longreach is a town and a locality in the Longreach Region, Queensland, Australia. It is the administrative centre of the Longreach Regional Council, which was established in 2008 as a merger of the former Longreach, Ilfracombe, and Isisford shires. Longreach is a well known tourist destination due to its aviation history and importance.

Geography

The town is on the Tropic of Capricorn in the south-east of the locality. The town is named after the ‘long reach’ of the Thomson River on which it is situated.

Lochern National Park is in the south-western part of the locality (formerly in Vergemont).

The main industries of the area are cattle, sheep, and, more recently, tourism.

The Landsborough Highway enters the locality from the south-east (Ilfracombe), passes through the town and then exits to the north-west (Corfield). The Central Western railway line takes the same route, the town being served by the Longreach railway station. The Thomson Developmental Road commences at the town and passes through the south-east of the locality (briefly passing through the westernmost part of Ilfracombe) before exiting to the south (Stonehenge).

In Longreach, the streets are named after species of birds, with the streets running east–west named after water birds and those running north–south after land birds. The main business street is called Eagle Street. Other streets honour Hudson Fysh, an Australian aviation pioneer, and Sir James Walker, a farmer and long-serving mayor of the former Longreach Shire Council.

History 
Longreach lies within the traditional tribal lands of the Iningai people. Iningai (also known as Yiningay, Muttaburra, Tateburra, Yinangay, Yinangi) is an Australian Aboriginal language spoken by the Iningai people. The Iningai language region includes the landscape within the local government boundaries of the Longreach Region, particularly the towns of Longreach, Barcaldine, Muttaburra and Aramac as well as the properties of Bowen Downs and catchments of Cornish Creek and Alice River.

Kuungkari (also known as Kungkari and Koonkerri) is a language of Western Queensland. The Kuungkari language region includes the landscape within the local government boundaries of Longreach Shire Council and Blackall-Tambo Shire Council.

The town was gazetted in 1887, and its post office opened on 1 October 1891.  The Central Western railway line reached the town on 15 February 1892, causing the population to grow.  Longreach State School opened on 22 May 1893 with an enrolment of 102 students, and the Presentation Sisters founded a primary school in 1900 that became Our Ladies' College. in 1920 Qantas was formed making a big start to the little town. St Joseph's Primary School was established in 1925. In 1935 Our Ladies' College expanded to offer secondary education to Year 10, becoming the first secondary school in Central Western Queensland.

Cominos Brothers opened a cafe in Eagle Street, the town’s main street in 1911. The cafe was known as Comino Bros. Central Café and American Bar, probably because it had an American-style soda fountain.

Longreach Rail Post Office opened by April 1940 and closed in 1962.

Longreach State High School opened on 24 January 1966.

Evesham State School opened in the former Morella on 23 January 1967. It was mothballed on 31 December 2009 and then permanently closed on 31 December 2010.

In 1970, Queen Elizabeth II, The Duke of Edinburgh and Her Royal Highness Princess Anne toured Australia including Queensland. The Queensland tour began on Sunday 12 April when the royal yacht Britannia entered Moreton Bay at Caloundra, sailing into Newstead Wharf. After several days of engagements in the city of Brisbane, Queen Elizabeth II and The Duke of Edinburgh commenced their regional tour flying to Longreach on Wednesday 15 April. The primary purpose for their stopover in Longreach was to visit the first operational base of Queensland’s first airline, Qantas, which became Australia’s Overseas Airline. During the visit they viewed an exhibition of Qantas memorabilia, including a replica of the company’s first aircraft, the AVRO 504K of 1921. The occasion marked the 50th anniversary of the founding of The Queensland and Northern Territory Aerial Services, Limited (Qantas). Qantas Airways celebrated its Centenary in 2020.

On 1 January 1986,  Our Ladies' College relocated to the St Joseph's site. A pre-school was added in 1992. It returned to being only a primary school (P-6) at the end of 1994. In 2002, the school changed its name to Our Ladies' School.

Longreach School of Distance Education (also known as Longreach School of the Air) opened on 27 January 1987.

In early April 2010, Longreach experienced a significant locust plague described by local residents as the worst in three decades.

In January 2019, it was decided to reduce the number of localities within Longreach Region by amalgamating the localities to the north and west of the town of Longreach into the locality of Longreach. The localities amalgamated were: Camoola, Chorregon, Ernestina, Maneroo, Morella, Tocal, and Vergemont. As a consequence of this amalgamation, the Longreach Region has only three localities: Longreach, Ilfracombe and Isisford.

Heritage listings 
Longreach has a number of heritage-listed sites, including:

Longreach railway station, Capricorn Highway
 Longreach Ambulance Centre, 111 Ibis Street
Qantas Hangar, Landsborough Highway
Darr River Downs, Landsborough Highway (formerly in Morella): 
 Former Longreach Powerhouse, 12 Swan Street

Facilities
Longreach has a visitor information centre, swimming pool, Powerhouse Museum and parks. Shopping facilities in the town include IGA, FoodWorks and Prices Plus. As part of nationwide restructuring, Target Country closed its store on Eagle Street in April 2021.

Longreach Regional Council operates the Longreach Library at 106 Eagle Street.

The Longreach branch of the Queensland Country Women's Association has its rooms in Duck Street. There is also a branch of the Queensland Country Women's Association in the former Morella (now part of Longreach).

Until 2021, Longreach had a local cinema.  Star Cinema Longreach operated for 33 years before closing due to a combination of the COVID-19 pandemic and the rise in popularity of streaming services.  Prior to the construction of the modern Star Cinema in 1988, films were shown at the Roxy Theatre which was rebuilt and reopened in 1953 after a fire destroyed the original premises in 1952 forcing films to be temporarily screened in the shire hall.

Education 
Longreach State School is a government primary (Early Childhood-6) school for boys and girls at 125 Ibis Street. In 2017, the school had an enrolment of 197 students with 19 teachers (18 full-time equivalent) and 17 non-teaching staff (12 full-time equivalent).

Longreach State High School is a government secondary (7-12) school for boys and girls at Jabiru Street. In 2017, the school had an enrolment of 179 students with 24 teachers (22 full-time equivalent) and 16 non-teaching staff (10 full-time equivalent).

Longreach School of Distance Education is a government primary and secondary (Early Childhood-10) school for boys and girls at Sir James Walker Drive. In 2017, the school had an enrolment of 181 students with 28 teachers (24 full-time equivalent) and 15 non-teaching staff (11 full-time equivalent).

Longreach State School Special Education Program is a primary and secondary (Early Childhood-12) special education program at Longreach State School at Kingfisher Street.

Our Lady's Catholic Primary School is a Catholic primary (Prep-6) school for boys and girls at 85 Eagle Street. In 2017, the school had an enrolment of 91 students with 10 teachers (9 full-time equivalent) and 7 non-teaching staff (4 full-time equivalent).

Media
The Longreach Leader newspaper is issued weekly. The Longreach area is also served by several locally based radio stations including ABC Western Queensland, and commercial stations 4LG and West FM.

Attractions

Longreach is the home of the Australian Stockman's Hall of Fame, which was officially opened in 1988 by Queen Elizabeth II. The purpose of the centre is to showcase the history and the culture of life in rural Australia. Since its opening, over 1 million people have passed through its doors.

Longreach was one of the founding centres for Qantas, the Australian domestic and international airline, the third oldest airline in the world (after KLM and Avianca), being founded on 16 November 1920 in Winton. One of the airline's original hangars remains in use at the Longreach Airport and is listed on the Australian National Heritage List. The town is now the home of the Qantas Founders Outback Museum, which includes amongst its displays a decommissioned Qantas Boeing 747-200 aircraft, registration VH-EBQ, The City of Bunbury, and Qantas's first jet aircraft VH-XBA (formerly VH-EBA), a Boeing 707, The City of Canberra. In recognition of the town's place in company history, as well as a play on the airliner's extended range, all of Qantas's Boeing 747-400s had "Longreach" printed on both sides of the first jetway entry/exit doors.

The town is home to the Australian Agricultural College's Longreach Campus, which prepares students for work in the agricultural and pastoral industries. It was known previously as the Longreach Pastoral College. The campus was opened in 1967. Adjacent to the college is the Longreach School of Distance Education, which provides lessons to remote students, formerly by HF radio but now using telephone lines. The agricultural college in Longreach closed December 2019.

Notable residents
Notable residents of Longreach include:

 Carl Barron, stand-up comedian, born in Longreach
 Lobby Loyde, guitarist in the Purple Hearts and Coloured Balls, born in Longreach
 Bruce Saunders, Member of the Queensland Legislative Assembly, born in Longreach
 Matthew Scott, rugby league footballer, born in Longreach
 Edgar Towner, Victoria Cross winner, died in Longreach and was buried in the cemetery there. His grave is a protected place.

Climate

Longreach experiences a  hot semi-arid climate (Köppen: BSh, Trewartha: BShl); with very hot summers with moderate rains; warm to hot springs and autumns with occasional rains; and mild, dry winters.

References

Further reading

External links

 Maps showing the locality of Longreach before and after the January 2019 amalgamations (archived before and after on 28 July 2019)

 
Towns in Queensland
Populated places established in 1888
1888 establishments in Australia
Longreach Region
Localities in Queensland